David Munro may refer to:

 David Munro (documentary filmmaker) (1944–1999), English documentary film-maker
 David Munro (police commissioner) (born 1948), British police commissioner
 David H. Munro (born 1955), creator of the Yorick programming language
 David Munro (physician) (1878–1952), director of the Royal Air Force Medical Service, and Rector of St Andrews University
 David Munro, American independent filmmaker of Full Grown Men
 David Munro (conservationist), former Director General of the International Union for Conservation of Nature
 David Munro (referee), a Scottish association football referee

See also 
 David Monro (scholar) (1836–1905), Scottish Homeric scholar
 David Monro (1813–1877), New Zealand politician
 David Monro (merchant) (c. 1765–1834), seigneur, businessman and political figure in Lower Canada
 David Munrow (1942–1976), English early music authority